Tenodera australasiae, the purple-winged mantis, is species of praying mantis. Found throughout Australia, it is common in the eastern regions. Both males and females are capable of flight. The species has not been shown to be parthenogenetic.

Range
All of Australia, but said to be absent in New Zealand.

Diet
The purple-winged mantis has varied diet consisting mainly of other insects, however, they have been seen eating much larger animals such as small frogs, lizards etc. Tenodera australasiae can be cannibalistic but not quite an aggressive mantis.

Related
The genus Tenodera has a number of species including: 
Tenodera aridifolia, 
Tenodera sinensis - Chinese mantis, 
Tenodera australasiae - purple-winged mantis, 
Tenodera superstitiosa found in Africa.

Additional Images

See also
List of Australian stick insects and mantids
Mantodea of Oceania

References

Mantidae
Mantodea of Oceania
Insects of Australia
Insects described in 1814